Select committee may refer to:

Select committee (parliamentary system), a committee made up of a small number of parliamentary members appointed to deal with particular areas or issues
Select or special committee (United States Congress)
Select committee (United Kingdom)